Nevyansky (masculine), Nevyanskaya (feminine), or Nevyanskoye (neuter) may refer to:
Nevyansky District, a district of Sverdlovsk Oblast
Nevyansky Urban Okrug, the municipal formation which this district is incorporated as
Nevyanskoye, a rural locality (a selo) in Sverdlovsk Oblast